The zebra moray (Gymnomuraena zebra) is a species of marine fish in the family Muraenidae. It is the only member of the genus Gymnomuraena, though it sometimes has been included in Echidna instead.

Description
The zebra moray is considered as a medium-sized fish even if it can reach a maximum length of 150 cm.
However, the average size commonly observed is more of the order of 50 cm.
It is densely banded dark and whitish, giving rise to its common name.
Its snout is round and short.

Distribution and habitat
The zebra moray is widespread throughout the Indo-Pacific area from eastern coast of Africa until western coast of the Americas, including the Red Sea, Hawaii and Galápagos.

The zebra moray is a benthic fish, its favorite habitat corresponds to the rocky or coral reef on coastal shallow water up to 40 meters deep.

Biology
Gymnomuraena zebra has a nocturnal activity and actively hunt its prey. Unlike most other moray eels, it feeds exclusively on crustaceans, sea urchins and mollusks.

References

External links
 

Muraenidae
Marine fauna of the Gulf of California
Western Central American coastal fauna
Galápagos Islands coastal fauna
Fish of Hawaii
Fish described in 1797
Taxa named by George Shaw